Gary Michael Rose (born 17 October 1947) is a retired United States Army officer and a Vietnam War veteran. For his actions during the war, Rose was recommended for the Medal of Honor, but this was downgraded to the Distinguished Service Cross due to the classified nature of the mission in Laos. He was finally presented the Medal of Honor on 23 October 2017.

After enlisting in the United States Army in 1967, Rose became a Special Forces combat medic, and in September 1970 distinguished himself in fighting in Laos at Chavane during Operation Tailwind, in which he treated the wounded while fighting People's Army of Vietnam (PAVN) forces. Despite being wounded multiple times during the battle, he treated 60–70 personnel. Rose continued his career in the army and graduated from Officer Candidate School, becoming a Field Artillery officer and reaching the rank of captain before retiring, after which he worked in the manufacturing industry.

Early life
Rose was born on 17 October 1947 in Watertown, New York, and later moved to the Los Angeles area. In 1965, he graduated from the James Monroe High School in Northridge. On 4 April 1967, he volunteered for the United States Army to avoid being drafted into the Marine Corps after his father, who had been in the Marine Corps during World War II, suggested one would not want to be a draftee in the Marine Corps.

Vietnam War
Rose attended basic training at Fort Ord and Infantry Advanced Individual Training at Fort Gordon. He was promoted to private first class after graduating from the latter and was sent to the United States Army Airborne School due to his high aptitude test scores. Rose entered Special Forces training at Fort Bragg in October, graduating a year later as a Special Forces medic. Rose was first assigned to the 7th Special Forces Group (Airborne). He reenlisted to be able to choose where he wanted to serve and in April 1969 was assigned to the 46th Special Forces Company in Lopburi, Thailand, where he trained Thai soldiers and border police medics.

In April 1970, Rose requested transfer to South Vietnam and was assigned to Military Assistance Command, Vietnam – Studies and Observations Group (SOG), for which the 5th Special Forces Group (Airborne) provided administrative support. He was based at Forward Operating Base II at Kontum, where he treated the wounded and local civilians. Rose was wounded on his first mission in June 1970, receiving his first Purple Heart and Bronze Star Medal. On 11 September, he and a company-size exploitation force of Americans, Vietnamese, and Montagnards were inserted by CH-53 Sea Stallion helicopters 70 kilometers inside Laos near Chavane in Operation Tailwind, a diversionary operation. Then-Sergeant Rose was responsible for medical care for fifteen other Americans and 120 Montagnards.

Medal of Honor action
After being inserted, the force advanced deeper into enemy territory, soon making contact with a PAVN squad, wounding two Americans and two Montagnards, one of whom was trapped outside the unit's defensive perimeter. Rose engaged the enemy while treating and stabilizing the soldier, carrying him through heavy fire back to the defensive positions. The company continued moving deeper into Laos following a PAVN withdrawal, engaging more PAVN forces and suffering more casualties. Disregarding his personal safety, Rose treated wounded under heavy fire, engaging the PAVN to reach the wounded.

The fire became so intense Rose was forced to crawl from position to position in order to treat the wounded, giving words of encouragement and directing the fire of the inexperienced and terrified South Vietnamese and Montagnard troops. Over the next few days, the company marched west and deeper into Laos, fending off incessant attacks from elements ranging from squad-sized to company-sized, covered by Air Force gunships. On 12 September, during an assault by a PAVN company-sized element, one of the Montagnards was wounded 40 to 50 meters outside the perimeter. Dodging enemy fire, Rose ran and crawled his way to the wounded man, shielding him with his own body while he treated him. He dragged the Montagnard back to the company with one hand while firing at the PAVN with his gun in his other hand.

When Rose returned to the company perimeter with the wounded soldier, he was sprayed with shrapnel from a B-40 rocket propelled grenade (RPG) in his back and leg, severely crippling his foot. For the rest of the mission, he used a stick as a crutch, continuing to treat the wounded while ignoring his own wounds. A MEDEVAC helicopter was later called in to evacuate the company's many wounded, but was unable to land in the small opening where the company was located. Rose stood up, fully exposed to the heavy enemy fire, and attempted to pass the wounded up to the hovering helicopter's crew. However, the intensity of the fire forced the pilot to abort the mission, and the helicopter, severely damaged, crashed a few kilometers away.

With the aid of close air support, the company was able to break out of their defensive position and Rose improvised litters for the wounded, who now were over half the company. Despite his own wounds, he never took time to eat, rest or care for his own wounds while treating the other soldiers. On the night of 13–14 September, the company was surrounded by the PAVN in their position. Rose dug trenches for the wounded and treated their injuries, as the enemy spent the night bombarding the company with rockets, grenades, and mortars. Moving from position to position, he exposed himself to PAVN fire, encouraging the soldiers and treating the wounded.

On 14 September, the last day of the operation, after destroying a PAVN base camp, the company was informed by a Forward Air Controller (FAC) that over 500 PAVN were advancing on their position. Supported by gunships, the company moved to a landing zone, setting up a perimeter while each platoon boarded the helicopters as the PAVN attacked from all sides, inflicting even more casualties. Rose exposed himself again under heavy fire, retrieving the dead and wounded and bringing them back to the perimeter. In great pain, he continued to treat the wounded, disregarding his own safety. When the extraction helicopters arrived, he returned to the outer perimeter to help engage the PAVN and repel the assault. Rose boarded the last extraction helicopter, delivering aimed accurate fire at the PAVN only an estimated 50 meters away as he hobbled up the loading ramp.

Rose was notified that a Marine door gunner had been shot through the neck and he rendered lifesaving medical treatment to the man before the helicopter crashed, several kilometers away from the original extraction point. Rose was thrown from the helicopter before it crashed, and while still dazed and wounded crawled back into the wreckage to pull out wounded and unconscious soldiers, knowing that it could explode at any moment. He continued to treat the wounded until another helicopter arrived to extract them. Upon returning to base, Rose, covered in blood and wounds, refused all treatment until the other wounded were treated first. He was credited with treating between 60 and 70 wounded and saving many lives; only three Montagnards died in Operation Tailwind.

Rose was nominated for the Medal of Honor, but the award was downgraded to the Distinguished Service Cross due to the classified nature of the mission in Laos. MACV commander General Creighton Abrams formally presented Rose the Distinguished Service Cross on 16 January 1971.

Later life
In April, when his tour in Vietnam ended, Rose was sent to the Spanish Language School in Anacostia, Washington, D.C. At the school Rose made the decision to attend Officer Candidate School because extending his contract with the Army would enable him to bring his new wife, Margaret, with him to Panama. After completing the school, he was assigned to the 8th Special Forces Group in Panama until August 1973, when he was selected to attend Officer Candidate School at Fort Benning. Rose received his commission as a second lieutenant in the Field Artillery in December, and attended the Field Artillery Officer Basic Course at Fort Sill. He graduated from Cameron University in Lawton with a Bachelor of Arts in Education and Military Science in December 1977. In 1978, Rose attended the Field Artillery Officer Advanced Course, and then was posted to various successive field assignments in Germany, New Mexico, South Korea, and Fort Sill over the next years. He retired from the Army with the rank of captain in May 1987.

Rose attended the University of Oklahoma, graduating in December 1989 with a Master of Arts in Communication. He worked as a writer of operator, user, and maintenance manuals and training designer for the manufacturing industry before finally retiring in 2010. Rose worked at Raytheon, which he left in 2003. He moved to Huntsville in 2005 to live near a friend who was a fellow Vietnam War veteran. In retirement, Rose remains involved in charity work, mainly through the Knights of Columbus.

Operation Tailwind controversy and Medal of Honor award

In 1998, a joint CNN and Time magazine report incorrectly described Operation Tailwind as a mission to kill American defectors and claimed that American troops used sarin on civilians. Rose was among the Tailwind veterans called to the Pentagon in late June for interviews on the operation, and they refuted the claims. The story was retracted after a Department of Defense report concluded that the story was incorrect. After the controversy, an initiative began by SOG veterans to get their comrades' heroism in Operation Tailwind recognized. In 2013, Rose received a call from Eugene McCarley, who commanded the company in Operation Tailwind, who told him that Army veteran and SOG researcher Neil Thorne wanted to request an upgrade to the Medal of Honor for Rose's DSC. Thorne requested information from Rose, and then-Secretary of Defense Ash Carter approved the award upgrade in 2016, and Alabama Representative Mo Brooks and Senator Jeff Sessions wrote Rose's name into the National Defense Authorization Act for Fiscal Year 2017, waiving the requirement the medal must be awarded within five years of the action. On 20 September 2017, the White House announced President Donald Trump would present Rose the Medal of Honor on 23 October. On 23 October, President Donald J. Trump presented Rose the Medal of Honor in a White House ceremony.

Personal life
Rose married Margaret in 1971 and has two daughters: Claire Rose and Sarah Bowen, and a son, Michael.

Medal of Honor citation
Rose's Medal of Honor citation reads:

Awards and decorations
During his service, Rose earned many decorations, including:

Thai Army Parachutist Badge
 Republic of Vietnam Parachutist Badge

See also

 Desmond Doss
 Harold A. Garman
 Thomas W. Bennett
 Joseph G. LaPointe Jr.

References

External links

 Rose's Distinguished Service Cross citation at Military Times Hall of Valor
 Gary Rose talks about the action for which he was awarded the Medal of Honor

1947 births
Living people
United States Army personnel of the Vietnam War
Combat medics
Cameron University alumni
University of Oklahoma alumni
United States Army officers
Recipients of the Distinguished Service Cross (United States)
People from Watertown, New York
Military personnel from New York (state)
Vietnam War recipients of the Medal of Honor